The Autostrada A18 is a  motorway on the Ionian coast of Sicily that links Messina to Catania. The motorway is linked to the A20 Messina-Palermo at its northern-end and to the A19 Palermo-Catania through the RA15 Catania's Ring Road at its southern-end. There is also a second stretch of A18, of 50 km, on the south part of the island, running from Syracuse to Rosolini, recently extended to Ispica/Pozzallo with ongoing works to extend to Modica.

Messina – Catania

A18dir Diramazione Catania Nord

Siracusa – Ragusa – Gela

A first part of only 9,5 km from Syracuse to Cassibile opened 15 June 1983. After this, one had to wait for over 20 years until in March 2008 a second stretch from Cassibile to Noto went into service. The latest part, from Noto to Rosolini, opened to traffic in October 2008. An other part was opened in August 2021 from Rosolini to Ispica

Siracusa – Ispica

Ispica – Ragusa
This part of the A18 was designed in the early '70s and required re-planning because the original project would have run through archeological areas and natural reserves (created in the '80s and '90s). The new project was completed in 2001 and is partially financed. Works started in 2014 taking the motorway from Rosolini to Ispica/Pozzallo, with the subsequent stretch to Modica at an advanced stage. The part from Rosolini to Ispica/Pozzallo was opened in August 2021.  The next part to Modica estimated for opening towards end of 2022.  Authorities are awaiting for further funding for the completion of this second part of the A18 that should run to Scicli and Ragusa.

Planned Exits (km from Syracuse):

Ragusa – Gela
The original plan of the A18 would have connected Ragusa to Gela.
This part of the project is in advanced state of re-planning but has not got any funding yet.

Planned Exits:
Ragusa
S.Croce Cam.-Vittoria south
Comiso-Vittoria
Acate
Gela

References

A18
Transport in Sicily